Ronaldo Alimohamed (born 3 October 1998) is a Guyanese cricketer. He made his List A debut on 23 November 2019, for Guyana in the 2019–20 Regional Super50 tournament. Prior to his List A debut, he was named in the West Indies' squad for the 2018 Under-19 Cricket World Cup.

References

External links
 

1998 births
Living people
Guyanese cricketers
Guyana cricketers
Place of birth missing (living people)